The European Fiscal Board (EFB) is the fiscal council of the European Union, watching over its fiscal sustainability. It was instituted in 2016 as one of the elements proposed by the Five Presidents’ Report in June 2015.

History 
The Five Presidents' Report report was prepared by then-President of the European Commission Jean-Claude Juncker, in close cooperation with the presidents of the European Council, Eurogroup, European Central Bank, and the European Parliament.

Activities 
The European Fiscal Board is mandated to make an independent assessment of the implementation of the Stability and Growth Pact, the set of common rules imposimg limits on the EU member states' national fiscal policymaking. The main objective of the commonly agreed fiscal rules is to avert negative cross-border effects of national fiscal policies and to secure a smooth functioning of the Economic and Monetary Union. The European Fiscal Board also issues advice on the general orientation of fiscal policy in the eurozone. In 2020, the European Fiscal Board supported the activation of the severe economic downturn clause of the Stability and Growth Pact. The clause allows for extra flexibility when applying the rules of the Pact. Over the years the European Fiscal Board has issued a number of proposals on how to improve the EU’s fiscal framework.

References 

European Commission projects
Fiscal policy
Agencies of the European Union